Metrical poetry in Sanskrit is called Chhandas or Chhandas and . The term Chandas (Sanskrit: छन्दः/छन्दस् chandaḥ/chandas (singular), छन्दांसि chandāṃsi (plural)) means "pleasing, alluring, lovely, delightful or charming", and is based on the root chad which means "esteemed to please, to seem good, feel pleasant and/or something that nourishes, gratifies or is celebrated". Chandas refers to the Vedas themselves. Lord Krishna refers to the Vedas as leaves of the tree of creation. Vedas being in verse-form (Chandas), also came to be known as Chandas. The term also refers to "any metrical part of the Vedas or other composition". Prose and poetry follows the rules of Chhandas to design the structural features of 'poetry'. Chhandas is a definable aspect of many definable and indefinable aspects of poetry. Chhandas generates rhythm to the literature when the rules are properly followed. Rhythm is important to literature as a preliminary attraction.

Construction of Chandas

Telugu Language 
In Telugu language, 'Chandas' is constructed based on the number of 'aksharaas' (syllables) in each line (also called paadam) of a poem.

As the same lines are repeated (aaVrutta), these are called 'Vruttaas'. If all the lines in a poem follow the same 'types of aksharaas', it is called a 'sama Vrutta'.

There are separate Telugu equivalents for English words 'letter' and 'syllable'. The first one is 'varNamu' (letter). This is the basic 'letter' of the Telugu in the alphabets, and is called 'varNa samaamnaayamu'. There are fifty six 'varNa samaamnaayamu'(s) in Telugu.

The equivalent for 'syllable' in Telugu is 'aksharamu'. 'Syllable' is often defined as the 'unit of pronunciation at a stretch' with a collection of letters (varNaas) in it.

For example, in a word like 'svapnamu', 'sva' is an aksharamu (syllable), but not a varNamu (letter) as it has two 'varNaas' (sa and va) in it.

These 'aksharaas' (syllables) are divided into 'laghuvu' and 'guruvu' based on the time period  of pronunciation. These 'aksharaas' or syllables are the fundamental aspects in constructing the 'chandas' in Telugu.

Meters of the same length are distinguished by the pattern of laghuvu ("light") and guruvu ("heavy") syllables in the paadam.

Pattern of laghuvu and guruvu in a sequence of three is called Gaṇam (Group). The word ya-maa-taa-raa-ja-bhaa-na-sa-la-gam is called Gana Suchi (Look up for Ganams). The Ganas are same as in Sanskrit Chandas.  
  guruvu-laghuvu-laghuvu = bha-ganam                                                           
  laghuvu-guruvu-laghuvu = ja-ganam
  laghuvu-laghuvu-guruvu = sa-ganam
  laghuvu-guruvu-guruvu = ya-ganam
  guruvu-laghuvu-guruvu = ra-ganam
  guruvu-guruvu-laghuvu= ta-ganam

  guruvu-guruvu-guruvu = ma-ganam
  laghuvu-laghuvu-laghuvu = na-ganam

These  are divided into three major categories:
  Surya Ganam
  Indra Ganam
  Chandra Ganam

Types of Chandas
Jaati
Upajaati
Vruttam or Vrutta

There are 26 types of chandas. Each 'chandas' is recognized by the number of 'aksharaas' or Syllables present in each line of the poem. As an 'akshara' can be either a 'laghuvu' or a 'guruvu', the number of variations possible in each type of 'chandas' follows a 'binary system'. The names /numbers of 'chandas' and the numbers of 'sama Vruttaas' that can be generated in each variety are as follows.

The total number of sama Vruttaas in 26 chandassus is 134,217,726.

In Kannada Language 
The poetical works of Old Kannada and Middle Kannada followed the rules of Chandas given by Nagavarma I in the book Chandombudhi. Kannada prosody is classified into three parts:

 Prāsa (ಪ್ರಾಸ)
 Yati (ಯತಿ)
 Gana (ಗಣ)

Prāsa 
Praasa or the rhyme scheme refers to the same consonant repeating periodically in each line. Again there are two types:

 Ādi  Prāsa: Rhyming of consonants at the beginning of the line 
 Antya Prāsa: Rhyming of consonants at the end of the line.

Yati 
While reading the poetry, to breathe, we stop/pause at some places without damaging the meanings of the poem. These places were called Yati. There were some rules for this. However, the usage of 'Yati' is very little in Kannada literature.

Gana 
Gana refers to a group. In Kannada prosody, Gana refers to the group of the syllables, letters, or units. There are three types:

 Mātra Gana: Gana classified on the basis of the syllables.
 Akshara Gana: Classified on the basis of letters.
 Ansha Gana: Classified on the basis of units or parts of the poem. Brahma, Vishnu and Rudra are the three types of Ansha Gana.

Mātrā Gana (ಮಾತ್ರಾ ಗಣ) 
One  means the time taken to pronounce a letter. Thus the gana classified on this basis is called Mātrā Gana. While classifying, the ganas are made of 3, 4 or 5 syllables.

There are two types of syllables in Sanskrit :

 Laghu : It is a short syllable ( based on time duration to pronounce). It is denoted by the symbol 'U'.
 Guru : It is a long syllable. ( based on time duration to pronounce). It is denoted by the symbol '-'.

A letter becomes Guru when it has following features 

 Long vowels (deergha swara)
 A letter preceding the combined letter (digraphs)
 Letter combined with anusvara or visarga
 Consonantal letter
 Diphthongs
 Last letter of third and sixth line of Shatpadi.

A letter is considered as Laghu when it does not have the above features.

Types of Kannada Chandassu (Based on Mātra Gana) 

 Kanda (ಕಂದ ಪದ್ಯ)
 Shatpadi (ಷಟ್ಪದಿ)
 RagaỊe (ರಗಳೆ)

Kanda Poem 
It is special type of Kannada prosody. Each Gana used in kanda poem has four .

Shatpadi 
It is a poem having six lines. Each Gana used in Shatpadi may have 3, 4, or 5 .

There are six types of Shatpadi. Each type has different rules, features and characteristics. The types are:

Shara (ಶರ), Kusuma (ಕುಸುಮ), Bhoga (ಭೋಗ), Bhaamini (ಭಾಮಿನಿ), Parivardhini (ಪರಿವರ್ಧಿನಿ), and Vaardhaka (ವಾರ್ಧಕ).

RagaỊe 
It is a poem having many lines. There are three types of ragale:

Utsaaha (ಉತ್ಸಾಹ), Mandanila (ಮಂದಾನಿಲ) and Lalita (ಲಲಿತ).

Akshara Gana (ಅಕ್ಷರ ಗಣ) 
Gana classified on the basis of letters or characters is known as Akshara Gana. The Akshara ganas are made of three letters or characters. A formula-sentence is used for this:   ya-maa-taa-raa-ja-bhaa-na-sa-la-gam ( ಯಮಾತಾರಾಜಭಾನಸಲಗಂ)

Thus we get eight akshara ganas by this. The ganas are same as in Sanskrit Chandas. The ganas are

 ya-gaṇa: ya-mā-tā = U – –
 ma-gaṇa: mā-tā-rā = – – –
 ta-gaṇa: tā-rā-ja     = – – U
 ra-gaṇa: rā-ja-bhā  = – U –
 ja-gaṇa: ja-bhā-na  = U – U
 bha-gaṇa: bhā-na-sa = – U U
 na-gaṇa: na-sa-la   = U U U
 sa-gaṇa: sa-la-gā   = U U –

Vruttas (ವೃತ್ತಗಳು) 
The poems written on the basis of Akshara gana are known as Vruttas. In Kannada Chandassu there are six types of vruttas:

 Utpala Mālā  (ಉತ್ಪಲಮಾಲಾ ವೃತ್ತ)
 Champaka Mālā (ಚಂಪಕಮಾಲಾ ವೃತ್ತ)
 Shārdūla Vikrīdita (ಶಾರ್ದೂಲ ವಿಕ್ರೀಡಿತ ವೃತ್ತ)
 Mattebha Vikrīdita (ಮತ್ತೇಭ ವಿಕ್ರೀಡಿತ ವೃತ್ತ)
 Sragdharā (ಸ್ರಗ್ಧರಾ ವೃತ್ತ)
 Mahā Sragdharā (ಮಹಾ ಸ್ರಗ್ಧರಾ ವೃತ್ತ)

See also
Kannada Language
Telugu language
Kannada literature
Telugu literature
Kannada and Telugu people
 Satavahana Dynasty
 Sanskrit grammar
 Sanskrit pronouns and determiners
 Chandam - A Complete Software for Telugu Chandassu.

References

External links
 Metrical Patterns (chandas), Chapter XVI of the Nāṭyaśāstra

Kannada language
Telugu language
Genres of poetry